As Cariocas (English: The Cariocas) is a 2010 Brazilian television series written by Euclydes Marinho, based on Sérgio Porto's novel of the same name. It aired on Rede Globo from 19 October 2010 to 21 December 2010. The series consists of 10 independent episodes, each one starring a different actress and set in a different neighborhood of Rio de Janeiro.

A spin-off entitled As Brasileiras was produced and aired by Rede Globo in 2012.

Premise 
As Cariocas is inspired by the novel of the same name by Sérgio Porto, written under the pseudonym Stanislaw Ponte Preta in 1967, and tells the story of 10 beautiful women from different Neighborhoods of Rio de Janeiro.

Cast 
 Alinne Moraes
 Adriana Esteves
 Paola Oliveira
 Fernanda Torres
 Cintia Rosa
 Sônia Braga
 Grazi Massafera
 Alessandra Negrini
 Deborah Secco
 Angélica

Episodes

Reception 
Patrícia Kogut of O Globo said that As Cariocas "has impeccable photography, inspired track sound and a good direction."

O Estado de S. Paulo said that As Cariocas, "premieres with a cast of beautiful actresses," and that "Daniel Filho re-creates the universe of the characters of Sérgio Porto with bossa."

References

External links 
 

Brazilian anthology television series
Brazilian television miniseries
2010 Brazilian television series debuts
2010 Brazilian television series endings
Rede Globo original programming
2010s Brazilian television series
Brazilian comedy television series
Portuguese-language television shows
Television shows set in Rio de Janeiro (city)